The Treaty of Zboriv was signed on August 18, 1649, after the Battle of Zboriv when the Crown forces of about 25,000, led by King John II Casimir of Poland, clashed against a combined force of Cossacks and Crimean Tatars, led by Hetman Bohdan Khmelnytsky and Khan İslâm III Giray of Crimea respectively, which numbered about 80,000.

Signing parties
 Ukrainian side representatives: Bohdan Khmelnytskyi, Ivan Vyhovsky
 Polish side representatives: Adam Kysil, Jerzy Ossoliński, Janusz Radziwiłł, Władysław Dominik Zasławski

Scope
According to the concluded agreement, the number of Registered Cossacks increased to 40,000; the Polish army and Jews were banned from the territory of the Kiev Voivodeship, Bratslav Voivodeship, and Chernihiv Voivodeship;  governmental offices in the Cossack Hetmanate could be held only by Cossack leaders, the Orthodox Church was granted privileges and the Crimean Khanate was to be paid a large sum of money.

The treaty was ratified by the Diet, which was in session between November 1649 and January 1650, but hostilities resumed when Catholic bishops refused to recognise the provisions of the treaty (admission to the Senate of the Orthodox metropolitan of Kiev, Sylvestr Kosiv).

See also
List of treaties

References

External links
 Arkadii Zhukovsky. Zboriv, Treaty of. Encyclopedia of Ukraine, vol. 5 (1993).

1649 in the Polish–Lithuanian Commonwealth
1649 treaties
Zboriv
Poland–Ukraine military relations
Treaties of the Cossack Hetmanate
Zboriv
17th century in the Zaporozhian Host